Platygaster is a genus of parasitoid wasps in the family Platygastridae. There are more than 560 described species in Platygaster.

See also
 List of Platygaster species

References

Further reading

External links

 

Parasitic wasps
Hymenoptera genera
Platygastridae